Mesenteric vein may refer to:
Superior mesenteric vein
Inferior mesenteric vein